Chariesthes socotraensis is a species of beetle in the family Cerambycidae. It was described by Adlbauer in 2002. It is known from Yemen.

References

Chariesthes
Beetles described in 2002